Kelley Armstrong (born 14 December 1968) is a Canadian writer, primarily of fantasy novels since 2001.

She has published thirty-one fantasy novels , thirteen in her Women series, five in her Cainsville series, six in her Rockton series, three in her Darkest Powers series, three in her Darkness Rising trilogy and three in the Age of Legends series, and three stand-alone teen thrillers. She has also published three middle-grade fantasy novels in the Blackwell Pages trilogy, with co-author Melissa Marr. As well, she is the author of three crime novels, the Nadia Stafford trilogy. She has also written several serial novellas and short stories for the Otherworld series, some of which are available free from her website. Starting in 2014, a Canadian television series based on the Women of the Otherworld, called Bitten, aired for 3 seasons on Space, and SyFy.

Biography 
Kelley Armstrong was born on 14 December 1968, the oldest of four siblings in a "typical middle-class family" in Sudbury, Ontario.

After graduating with a degree in psychology from The University of Western Ontario, Armstrong then switched to studying computer programming at Fanshawe College so she would have time to write.

"I'm a former computer programmer, but I have escaped my corporate cubicle and hope never to return"

Her first novel Bitten was sold in 1999, and it was released in 2001. Following her first success she has written a total of 13 novels and a number of novellas in the world of the Women of the Otherworld series, and her first crime novel, Exit Strategy, was released July 2007. Armstrong has been a full-time writer and parent since 2002.

Her novel No Humans Involved (the seventh book of the Women of the Otherworld series) was a New York Times bestseller in the hardback fiction category on 20 May 2007.
Also, her YA novel The Awakening was a No. 1 New York Times bestseller in the Children's Chapter books category on 17 May 2009.

Description of work 
Armstrong's Women of the Otherworld series is part of a recently popular contemporary fantasy subgenre of the fantasy genre that superimposes supernatural characters upon a backdrop of contemporary North American life, with strong romantic elements.  Within that subgenre, she is notable for including many types of supernatural characters, including witches, sorcerers, werewolves, necromancers, ghosts, shamans, demons and vampires, rather than limiting herself primarily to a single type of supernatural creature.  Most of her works have a mystery genre plot, with leading characters investigating some novel situation or unsolved question.

In the Otherworld novels, most supernatural powers are either hereditary, or arise from the act of an existing supernatural of the same type.  The Otherworld, while it has overarching conflicts and plotlines that span multiple novels, is not an epic battle between good and evil.  The novels are largely episodic with the continuing plotlines primarily involving the developing lives of the main characters.

Her contemporary fantasy writings share genre similarities with writers Charlaine Harris, Laurell K Hamilton and Kim Harrison.

Bibliography

Standalone novels 
 Wherever She Goes (2019)
Every Step She Takes (2020)

Young adult 

 The Masked Truth (2015)
 The Unquiet Past (2016)
 Missing (2017)
 Aftermath (2018)

The Women of the Otherworld Series 

 All other stories may be found on the series' main article.

Otherworld novellas

Otherworld Young Adult 

 Wolf"s Bane (Oct 2019)
 Wolf's Curse (Mar 2020)

The Nadia Stafford Series 

Exit Strategy (novel, Jul 2007)
Made to be Broken (novel, Feb 2009)
Wild Justice (novel, late 2013)
Double Play (Apr 2016)
Perfect Victim (Nov 2017)

The Darkest Powers Series

The Darkest Powers Trilogy

The Darkness Rising Trilogy

Cainsville series
 Omens (novel, Aug 2013)
 Visions (novel, Aug 2014)
 Deceptions (novel, Aug 2015)
 Betrayals (novel, Aug 2016)
 Rituals (novel, Aug 2017)
 Portents: A Collection of Cainsville Tales (collection, Aug 2018)
 Cruel Fate (novella, Apr 2019)
 Rough Justice (novella, Jun 2018)
 Lost Souls (novella, Mar 2017)

The Age of Legends Series 
 Sea of Shadows (novel, 2014)
 Empire of Night (novel, 2015)
 Forest of Ruin (novel, 2016)

The Blackwell Pages Trilogy 
Written under the alias: K. L. Armstrong. Co-authored with Melissa Marr.

Loki's Wolves (2013)
Odin's Ravens (May 2014)
Thor's Serpent (May 2015)

Rockton novels 
 City of the Lost (Jan 2017)
 A Darkness Absolute (Nov 2017)
 This Fallen Prey (Nov 2018)
Watcher in the Woods (Nov 2019)
Alone in the Wild (Feb 2020)
A Stranger in Town (Feb 2021)
The Deepest of Secrets (Feb 2022)

A Royal Guide to Monster Slaying 

 A Royal Guide to Monster Slaying (Aug 2019)
 The Gryphon's Lair (Jun 2020)
The Serpent's Fury (Jun 2021)
The Final Trial (Jun 2022)

A Stitch in Time

Cursed Luck

A Rip Through Time

Series in collaboration

Anthologies and collections

Notes

References

External links

 
 Armstrong's online fiction center

 

1968 births
Canadian fantasy writers
Canadian horror writers
Canadian mystery writers
20th-century Canadian novelists
21st-century Canadian novelists
Canadian women novelists
Fanshawe College alumni
Living people
Writers from Greater Sudbury
University of Western Ontario alumni
Urban fantasy writers
Women mystery writers
Women science fiction and fantasy writers
Women horror writers
20th-century Canadian women writers
21st-century Canadian women writers
Canadian thriller writers